This is a list of seasons completed by the Las Vegas Raiders American football franchise of the National Football League (NFL). The team originated in Oakland, California as the Oakland Raiders, where they first played 22 seasons from 1960 to 1981. From 1982 to 1994, the team played 13 seasons in Los Angeles as the Los Angeles Raiders, before returning to Oakland in 1995. The team played 25 seasons in its second stint in Oakland from 1995 to 2019. In 2017, the Raiders officially announced their relocation from Oakland to the Las Vegas metropolitan area. In 2020, the Raiders began play as the Las Vegas Raiders at the newly constructed Allegiant Stadium. 

From 1960 to 2020, the franchise has played a total of 61 seasons. The Raiders have won one AFL championship and three Super Bowl titles. The team won the AFL Championship in 1967 prior to the 1970 AFL–NFL merger and lost their first Super Bowl appearance in Super Bowl II. The franchise would go on to win their next three Super Bowl appearances in Super Bowl XI, Super Bowl XV, and Super Bowl XVIII.

Seasons

1 Due to a strike-shortened season in 1982, all teams were ranked by conference instead of division.

References

 
 

Oakland Raiders seasons
Los Angeles Raiders seasons
Las Vegas Raiders seasons
Las Vegas Raiders
Seasons
Seasons